USLHT Cedar was a lighthouse tender in commission in the fleet of the United States Lighthouse Service in 1917 and from 1919 to 1939, and – as USCGC Cedar (WAGL-207) – in the fleet of the United States Coast Guard from 1939 to 1950. She was in commissioned service in the United States Navy as the patrol vessel USS Cedar from 1917 to 1919 during and in the immediate aftermath of World War I. She also saw service in World War II under U.S. Navy control while in the Coast Guard fleet. She spent her career in the Pacific Northwest and the Territory of Alaska.

Construction and commissioning

Cedar was constructed in 1916–1917 by the Craig Shipbuilding Company in Long Beach, California, for the United States Lighthouse Service. Designed for extended cruises in the waters of the Territory of Alaska, she was the largest lighthouse tender built for the Lighthouse Service. She had a steel hull with a double bottom and a wooden superstructure. She was completed in 1917 and commissioned into service in the Lighthouse Service's fleet as USLHT Cedar on 30 June 1917.

Service history

World War I
Shortly after Cedars completion, the Lighthouse Service transferred her to the United States Navy in August 1917 for World War I service. Commissioned into Navy service as USS Cedar, she operated as a patrol vessel in the Thirteenth Naval District in the Pacific Northwest.

At 14:00 on 24 October 1918, Cedar received word that the Canadian passenger steamer  had run aground in a snowstorm 11 hours earlier on Vanderbilt Reef in Lynn Canal in Southeast Alaska during a voyage from Skagway to Juneau, Territory of Alaska. She established wireless contact with Princess Sophia and proceeded immediately to the scene, arriving there at 20:00 and finding that the fishing schooner King & Winge, two other large vessels, and 15 smaller fishing vessels also were there. Cedar was only the rescue vessel equipped with wireless, so her captain, J. W. Ledbetter, began to organize a rescue attempt. Training Cedar′s searchlights on Princess Sophia, Ledbetter could see that waves were breaking against her hull, making it too dangerous for Princess Sophia to launch her lifeboats. Princess Sophia and the rescue ships agreed to await high tide at 05:00 on 25 October to attempt to launch the boats, then cancelled that plan out of concern for the safety of the boats, and Cedar anchored in the lee of a nearby island for the night.

By 0900 on 25 October 1918, a gale was blowing and Ledbetter, who had brought Cedar back to the scene of Princess Sophia′s grounding, was having trouble keeping Cedar on station. He decided to try to anchor Cedar  downwind of Vanderbilt Reef, fire a line to Princess Sophia, and then evacuate all on board by breeches buoy, but anchoring proved impossible. As conditions worsened, Cedar and King & Winge took shelter behind Sentinel Island, and Captain Miller of King & Winge came aboard Cedar to discuss further rescue options. They decided that if the weather moderated enough, they would attempt to anchor King & Winge near Vanderbilt Reef while Cedar anchored to windward of King and Winge to create a lee; Cedar would then launch her boats, which would ferry Princess Sophia′s passengers and crew to King and Winge. Ledbetter and Miller agreed that it would be best to wait until 26 October to attempt the rescue, as Princess Sophia appeared to be withstanding the pounding she was taking on the reef and it was possible the weather would improve enough by 26 October to make a rescue less risky.

At 16:50 on 25 October, however, just as Miller was departing Cedar, Princess Sophia sent a distress signal saying that she was sinking. Cedar got underway from Sentinel Island in an attempt to reach her, but conditions were so extreme that she was herself in danger, and after 30 minutes she had to turn back. Sometime around 17:50, Princess Sophia slipped off the reef and sank with the loss of all 343 people aboard, the worst maritime disaster in the combined history of Alaska and British Columbia. On 26 October 1918, Cedar, King & Winge, and other vessels reached the scene of the sinking, and found only Princess Sophias mast protruding above water; they recovered bodies, but found no survivors. Cedar and King & Winge proceeded to Juneau, where Ledbetter sent out a wire which reported "No sign of life. No hope of survivors."

Cedar remained in U.S. Navy service through the end of World War I on 11 November 1918 and during its immediate aftermath. By executive order, the Navy transferred her back to the Lighthouse Service on 1 July 1919.

1919–1941

As USLHT Cedar, the ship returned to lighthouse tender duty, operating in Alaskan waters. After the 12-gross register ton motor vessel Anna Helen suffered a gasoline explosion and caught fire when her gasoline engine backfired at the junction of Icy Strait and Lynn Canal in the Alexander Archipelago in Southeast Alaska about  outside the entrance to Funter Bay on 22 October 1928, Cedar and the motor vessel Gloria responded to render assistance. Gloria rescued Annie Helen′s two-man crew from a dory and Cedar and Gloria stood by the burning vessel, but Annie Helen was consumed by the flames and sank without Cedar or Gloria having a chance to do anything to save her.

On 1 July 1939, the U.S. Lighthouse Service was abolished and the United States Coast Guard took over its responsibilities and assets, and Cedar thus became part of the Coast Guard fleet as USCGC Cedar.

World War II
On 1 November 1941, with World War II raging in Europe, North Africa, and the Middle East, the U.S. Coast Guard was transferred to the control of the U.S. Navy under Executive Order 8929, and Cedar thus again came under U.S. Navy control only weeks before the United States entered the war on 7 December 1941. Given the hull classification symbol WAGL-207, and stationed at Ketchikan, Territory of Alaska, she was assigned to the Thirteenth Naval District in the Pacific Northwest and the Seventeenth Naval District in the Territory of Alaska, including the Aleutian Islands, for duty in support of aids to navigation. During 1942 and 1943, she operated in support of Allied forces in the Aleutian Islands during the Aleutian Islands Campaign.

Post-World War II
Returned to U.S. Coast Guard control after the conclusion of World War II, Cedar was stationed at Kodiak, Territory of Alaska. The Coast Guard decommissioned her on 29 June 1950 and laid her up at Seattle, Washington. After five years of inactivity, she was sold on 27 June 1955 for scrapping.

References
 
 

Ships of the United States Lighthouse Service
Ships of the United States Coast Guard
Lighthouse tenders of the United States
World War I patrol vessels of the United States
World War II auxiliary ships of the United States
1916 ships
Ships built in California
Ships of the Aleutian Islands campaign